The following is a list of pipeline accidents in the United States in 2020. It is one of several lists of U.S. pipeline accidents. See also list of natural gas and oil production accidents in the United States.

Incidents 
This is not a complete list of all pipeline accidents. For natural gas alone, the Pipeline and Hazardous Materials Safety Administration (PHMSA), a United States Department of Transportation agency, has collected data on more than 3,200 accidents deemed serious or significant since 1987.

A "significant incident" results in any of the following consequences:

 fatality or injury requiring in-patient hospitalization
 $50,000 or more in total costs, measured in 1984 dollars
 liquid releases of five or more barrels (42 US gal/barrel)
 releases resulting in an unintentional fire or explosion

PHMSA and the National Transportation Safety Board (NTSB) post incident data, and results of investigations, into accidents involving pipelines that carry a variety of products, including natural gas, oil, diesel fuel, gasoline, kerosene, jet fuel, carbon dioxide, and other substances. Occasionally pipelines are repurposed to carry different products.

On May 4, a gas transmission pipeline exploded and burned in Fleming County, Kentucky. There were no injuries.
On May 5, a leak occurred in a relief line, at a Keystone Pipeline Terminal in Beaumont, Texas. About 18,500 gallons of crude oil were spilled. The cause seemed to be internal corrosion.
On July 28, a gas line explosion and fire occurred in Martin County, Texas, which injured four workers. A ditching truck hit an existing high-pressure gas line, causing an explosion and fire.
On July 29, a contractor ruptured a gas pipeline in Mont Belvieu, Texas, causing an explosion and fire. There were no injuries.
2020 Colonial Pipeline oil spill: On August 14, a Colonial Pipeline mainline, a 40-inch pipeline, was discovered to be leaking in the Oehler Nature Preserve near Huntersville, North Carolina. Approximately 1.2 million gallons of gasoline were spilled. The leak was near a previously repaired area.
On August 18, an El Paso Natural Gas transmission pipeline exploded and burned near Midland, Texas. There were no injuries.
On August 21, a dredging vessel hit a submerged Enterprise Products propane pipeline in the harbor of Corpus Christi, Texas, causing an explosion and fire. Five of the crew were killed, and six others were injured.
On September 10, Florida Gas Transmission’s 12-inch Sanford Lateral gas pipeline ruptured and subsequently ignited in Sanford, Florida.  The size of the burn area around the rupture site was determined to be 515 feet by 100 feet. 20 nearby homes were evacuated, but there were no injuries reported.
On September 24, Florida Gas Transmission’s FLMEA-21 18-inch pipeline ruptured and ejected multiple pieces of pipeline into the air in Lake Worth, Florida. There was no fire and no injuries, but the outside lane of northbound traffic on the Florida Turnpike was closed while FGT assessed the damage and initiated repairs. An unknown number of people were evacuated from commercial businesses and a nearby elementary school.
On September 24, Natural Gas Pipeline Company of America's 20-inch Indian Basin Pipeline ruptured and released approximately 31,757 MCF (31,757,000 cubic feet) of natural gas in Eddy County, New Mexico. There was no fire or injuries.
On December 24, a gas transmission pipeline exploded and burned, in Lyons, Nebraska. There were no injuries. Scores and gouges on the pipe suggested earlier damage caused the failure.

References 

Lists of pipeline accidents in the United States
2020 disasters in the United States